Inki and the Minah Bird is a 1943 Merrie Melodies short directed by Chuck Jones. The short features Inki and was released on November 13, 1943.

Plot
Inki is an African child who runs into a denture-wearing lion while hunting with a spear. The lion then chases the young native all over the place. The minah bird joins forces with Inki against the mighty lion, but proceeds to mess everything up for all.

Home media
 VHS
Inki & the Minah Bird (released by Troy Gold in 1988) - re-released by Burbank Video in 1991
 Kartoon Klassics Volume 10 (released by Viking Video Classics in 1986) - re-released by Burbank Video in 1991
 Laserdisc
The Golden Age of Looney Tunes: Volume 3, Side 3 (released by MGM/UA Home Video)
 DVD
Cartoon Craze Presents: Donald Duck / Woody Woodpecker: Pantry Panic (released by Digiview Productions)

Notes and bans
Inki and the Minah Bird was the only Inki short to fall into the public domain; all the rest in the series are under copyright.

Because this cartoon portrays stereotypes of Indian and black cultures, it is no longer included in USA television packages, along with the other four Inki shorts. It includes scenes or situations that portray potentially offensive, negative or otherwise socially unacceptable content which may be perceived as fostering stereotypes of African-Americans.

References

External links